This is a list of tertiary schools in Davao City, Philippines.

Universities

A

 Ateneo de Davao University, the Jesuit university in the Davao region

L
 Lyceum of the Philippines – Davao, the first LPU campus outside Luzon

U

 University of Mindanao - Davao region's oldest and the first private, non-sectarian university in Mindanao
 University of the Immaculate Conception - the oldest Catholic school in Mindanao, founded in 1905 by the Congregation of the Religious of the Virgin Mary
 University of Southeastern Philippines - the first state university in the Davao Region
 University of the Philippines Mindanao - the country's national university and premier institution of higher learning, serving as the U.P. System's flag-bearer in Mindanao

International and Science Schools

F

H 

 Holy Child College of Davao

J 

 Joji Ilagan International Schools

I 
International Management School
Institute of Culinary and Hospitality Entrepreneurship

M 

 Mindanao Kokusai Daigaku (Mindanao International College)

P 

 Precious International School of Davao
 Philippine Nikkei-Jin Kai International School
 Philippine Science High School Southern Mindanao Campus

S 

 St. Patrick Math-Sci School - Laverna Hills Campus
 Stockbridge American International School

Colleges

A 

 Agro-Industrial College of The Philippines
 AMA College of Davao
 Assumption College of Davao
 Assumption Polytechnic College of Southern Mindanao

B 

 Brokenshire College of Davao

C 

 Christian Colleges of Southeast Asia
 Colegio de San Ignacio Inc.
 Career Institute of Southeast Asia

D 

 Davao Central College Inc.
 Davao Doctors' College
 Davao Medical School Foundation
 Davao Vision Colleges, Inc. - founded by Korean missionaries in the city
 DMMA College of Southern Philippines (formerly Davao Merchant Marine Academy, a tertiary institution in the city which primarily offers maritime courses)

G 

 Gabriel Taborin College of Davao Inc.

H 
 Holy Child College of Davao
 Holy Cross of Davao College
 Holy Cross College of Calinan
 Holy Cross College of Sasa

J 

 Jose Maria College

M 

 Mapúa Malayan Colleges Mindanao
 MATS College of Technology
 Mindanao Medical Foundation College

P 

 Philippine College of Technology
 Philippine Women's College of Davao(0 base)

R 

 Rizal Memorial Colleges

S 

 Samson Polytechnic College of Davao - formerly Samson Technical Institute, a TESDA-accredited tertiary institution
 St. Joseph Technical Academy of Davao City - a TESDA-accredited institution
 San Lorenzo College of Davao - established in 2002 by Emmanuel Cifra
 San Pedro College - founded in 1956 by the Dominican Sisters of the Trinity from Quebec, Canada
 St. Paul College (Davao Campus)
 St. Peter's College of Toril - a private Filipino Catholic school located in Brgy. Toril, and owned and administered by the Presentation of Mary Sisters (PM)
 STI College of Davao

T 

 Tecarro College Foundation

Future colleges and universities 
 A campus of De La Salle University will open inside a central business district in Matina District, on an undetermined date
 City College of Davao, city government funded higher educational institution

References

External links 
 List of Higher Education Institutions at Commission on Higher Education (Philippines) – Select "Region XI – Davao Region"

Davao City
 
Davao City